Emil Groytsev (born 16 October 1964) is a Bulgarian rower. He competed in the men's coxed pair event at the 1988 Summer Olympics.

References

1964 births
Living people
Bulgarian male rowers
Olympic rowers of Bulgaria
Rowers at the 1988 Summer Olympics
People from Smolyan Province